George Howard Hartong (July 18, 1896 – August 1973) was an American football player.  A native of Joliet, Illinois, he played college football at the University of Chicago and professional football as a guard, tackle, and center for the Hammond Pros, Racine Legion, and Chicago Cardinals in the National Football League (NFL). He appeared in 21 NFL games, 18 as a starter, from 1921 to 1924.

References

1896 births
1973 deaths
People from Joliet, Illinois
Players of American football from Illinois
Hammond Pros players
Racine Legion players
Chicago Cardinals players
Chicago Maroons football players